Ingomar is an unincorporated community located near Mississippi Highway 15 in Union County, Mississippi.

References

Unincorporated communities in Union County, Mississippi
Unincorporated communities in Mississippi